The Albert Hall is a music venue in Manchester, England.

Built as a Methodist central hall in 1908 by the architect William James Morley of Bradford and built by J. Gerrard & Sons Ltd of Swinton, it has been designated by English Heritage as a Grade II listed building. The main floor was used as a nightclub from 1999 to 2011. The second floor, the Chapel Hall, unused since 1969, was renovated in 2012–14 for music concerts.

The venue hosted a few events towards the end of 2013. It officially reopened on 6 February 2014, with a performance by Anna Calvi.

History
The hall was designed in eclectic style with Baroque and Gothic elements for the Wesleyan Mission in 1908. A meeting hall is on the first floor with a horseshoe gallery, sloping floor and coloured glass rooflights. The finely detailed terracotta is formed into large windows at gallery level, and the interior is abundant in floral decoration in the plaster work and glazed tiles.

In the 1990s, the lower two floors were converted into a nightclub called Brannigans which closed in 2011. The hall was refurbished and re-opened in 2013 by Trof, a local independent bar and live music company.

General election 2017
On 6 June 2017, the Albert Hall hosted BBC Newsbeat Debates: The Final Debate ahead of the UK General Election two days later.

Tina Daheley chaired audience questions for Jonathan Bartley, Sarah Champion, Fflur Elin, Kate Forbes, David Kurten, Brian Paddick, and Nadhim Zahawi.

References

Former Methodist churches in the United Kingdom
Methodist churches in Greater Manchester
Grade II listed buildings in Manchester
Music venues in Manchester